The Police ranks of Italian police officers denote the position of a given officer in the police hierarchy in Italian police forces.

The design of the rank badges were changed following the reorganization of careers in July 2017.

Officers

Others

Officers
There are about 3,250 officers in the Guardia di Finanza. Officer cadets for the general and aeronaval branches are recruited through competitive examinations open to Italian citizens, not over 22 years of age, with a high school diploma giving access to university studies. Officer cadets for the technical and logistic branches need a bachelor or master's degree, and to be under the age of 32. The successful cadets graduate as First Lieutenants with a master's degree in Economic and Financial Security Sciences. 

Non-commissioned officers
There are 24,000 inspectors in the Guardia di Finanza. Participation in the competition for the recruitment of inspectors in the general and naval branches is open to Italian citizens aged between 18 and 26 years, having a diploma of secondary school giving access to university studies. Inspectors in the naval branch continue with a year at the nautical school in Gaeta. There are 13,500 superintendents in the Guardia di Finanza. Superintendents are recruited through promotion from the ranks of the senior agents. There are 28,000 appointees (senior agents) and agents in the Guardia di Finanza. Competition for appointments as agents trainee is open for Italian citizens with one year's enlistment in the Italian defence forces. Recruits are given basic training at either the Recruit School in Bari or the Alpine School in Predazzo.

State Forestry Corps 

The ranks of the former State Forestry Corps.

See also 
 Police ranks of France
 Police ranks of Poland
 Police ranks of Spain

References

External links 
 Legislative Decree 29 May 2017, n. 95, Tabella G (Article 45, comma 14)
 Carabinieri ranks
 Guardia di Finanza ranks
 Polizia di Stato ranks
 Polizia Penitenziaria ranks
 Municipal Police ranks in Tuscany

Carabinieri
Corpo Forestale dello Stato
Defunct law enforcement agencies of Italy
Guardia di Finanza
National law enforcement agencies of Italy
Polizia Penitenziaria
Polizia di Stato
Specialist law enforcement agencies of Italy
Police ranks by country